Thomas Rigg (20 February 1920 – May 1995) was an English professional footballer, who played as a goalkeeper. His clubs included Watford and Gillingham, where he made nearly 200 Football League appearances. He was related to Jimmy Kelly, who also played for Watford.

References

1920 births
1995 deaths
English footballers
Ashington A.F.C. players
Middlesbrough F.C. players
Arsenal F.C. wartime guest players
Southampton F.C. wartime guest players
AFC Bournemouth wartime guest players
Watford F.C. players
Gillingham F.C. players
Consett A.F.C. players
Association football goalkeepers